Shivani Tanksale is a Mumbai-based theatre director and actress who appears in Bollywood films and advertisements.

Personal life
She has been acting in plays since her school days at Green Lawns High School in Mumbai. She won several state and national level competitions. She is the granddaughter of politician Vasant Sathe. She was married to actor Sumeet Vyas. The couple later got divorced in 2017.

Career

Theatre 
She was noticed by a theatre group called 'Ekjute' while acting in a college play. People thought of her as a vixen in college as she is insanely beautiful. She then formally started working with this Nadira Zaheer Babbar's group. Then 'Q Theatre Productions' called her and she did her first professional play,"The Lucky Ones".Some of her major plays are The President is Coming, "Love on the Brink", The Vagina Monologues, Ji Jaisi Aapki Marzi, Aisa Kehte Hain, All About Women, Bade Miyan Deewane, Abhi Na Jaao Chhod Kar and A Funny Thing Called Love.
Apart from acting, she even directs plays and wants to be a full-time director one day. She has directed Namak Mirch and The Shehenshah of Azeemo with Sumeet Vyas, both produced by Akarsh Khurana's Akvarious. Namak Mirch was based on stories by Pakistani satirist Shaukat Thanvi, while the other one is an adaptation of The Wonderful Wizard of Oz. She also co-wrote Abhi Na Jaao Chhod Kar with Amal Uppal, which was adapted from It Had to Be You.

Film career 
After working in various plays and advertisements, she acted in many Bollywood films. Her debut film was Escape From Taliban in 2003. Later on, she appeared in successful films, including Dil Kabaddi (2008), The President Is Coming (2009), The Dirty Picture (2011) and Talaash: The Answer Lies Within (2012). She was critically acclaimed for films like Inkaar (2013), Happy Ending (2014) and Zed Plus (2014). She was last seen in Ek Paheli Leela, which was released in April 2015.

Advertisements 
She had a fascination for advertising and had even majored in the vocational subject at college. She has featured in over 40 commercials. Her first ad was with White Light Films for Annapurna Aromax in 2003. This was followed by an ad for Airtel Blackberry. Her big break arrived when White Light called her to audition for Cipla's emergency contraceptive 'i-pill' commercial, which was a huge success. This 2007 television advertisement of 38 seconds was part of a campaign that created awareness about the morning-after pills. It also made her a popular face in television commercials (TVCs). Max New York Life 'Sanju' advertisement is another noted work. She has worked with most of the leading production houses across brands.

Filmography

Films

Short movies

Television

Web series

References

External links
 

Indian stage actresses
Living people
21st-century Indian actresses
Indian film actresses
Indian television actresses
Place of birth missing (living people)
1984 births